There are thousands of programming languages. These are listed in various ways:

 
Lists of language lists